O Pai Tirano (lit. The Tyrant Father) is a 1941 Portuguese film comedy directed by António Lopes Ribeiro, starring Vasco Santana, Ribeirinho (Francisco Ribeiro), Leonor Maia, Teresa Gomes and Laura Alves. It is one of the best-known comedies of its genre, the comédia à portuguesa of the Golden Age of Portuguese cinema, still popular six decades after its release.

O Pai Tirano was the first film produced and directed by António Lopes Ribeiro.

Plot
Francisco Mega (Ribeirinho), a clerk at the then leading department stores of Lisbon, "Grandes Armazéns do Grandella", is in love with Tatão (Leonor Maia), who works in front at "Perfumaria da Moda". Tatão, however, is a cinephile who largely ignores him, whereas Francisco is also an amateur theatre player; so his amateur theatre company, the Grandellinhas, uses its rehearsals of the play O Pai Tirano (ou O Último dos Almeidas) to present Francisco as a son who split from his tyrant father for love, and woo Tatão.

Distribution 
 Ribeirinho : Francisco 'Chico' Mega
 Leonor Maia : Tatão
 Arthur Duarte : Artur de Castro
 Vasco Santana : Mestre José Santana
 Barro Lopes : Lopes
 Graça Maria : Gracinha

Popular culture 
O Pai Tirano offered a number of situations that became common reference in Portuguese culture.

Among them, a scene almost at the end of the movie, where one of the members of the theatre company, middle-aged Mr. Machado (a caricature of the don't-bother-couldn't-care-less Portuguese) takes his new girlfriend to dinner at the theatre buffet. To each request the lady makes, the item is unavailable, so they ask what she wants, and they repeatedly request "two glasses of white wine."

This line has since been used in adds for a Portuguese spirit.

References 
O Pai Tirano at Amor de Perdição

External links 
 

1940s Portuguese-language films
1941 films
Portuguese black-and-white films
Films directed by António Lopes Ribeiro
1941 comedy films
Portuguese comedy films